Gossip Girls is the fourth studio album and third Japanese release by South Korean idol group T-ara. It was released on May 14, 2014, as their second album release under Universal Music Japan sub-label EMI Records Japan in two limited editions and a regular edition.

Release and promotion
Gossip Girls was released in three versions: a CD+DVD+Photobook Edition (Diamond), a CD+DVD Edition (Sapphire), and a CD Only Edition (Pearl). Diamond edition includes a 36-page photobook and all editions come with one enclosed trading card which is randomly chosen out of 7 types.

The album includes five new original Japanese songs: "Just Now," "Lucky Wannabee!," "Keep on Walking," "Knockin' on My Heart," and "Musica Musica". The secret track is the same song "Do You Know Me," originally track #8, played again with slightly different lyrics.

Commercial performance

Gossip Girls debuted at number seven on the Oricon Albums Chart, with first-week sales of 10,463 in Japan. In its second week, the album dropped to number 49 and sold 1,467 copies. The album fell out the top 100 in its third week. The album ranked at number 24 on the Oricon Monthly Albums Chart, selling 12,680 copies.

Singles

Two singles have been released prior to the album.

"Number Nine / Memories: You Gave Me Guidance" is the eighth Japanese single and first double A-side single released by T-ara. It was released in four editions: two Limited CD+DVD editions, a regular edition and a Christmas edition. The song "Number Nine" is a Japanese version of the original Korean song, released on their fifth Korean mini album Again. The song "Memories: You Gave Me Guidance" (Japanese: "記憶 ~君がくれた道標(みちしるべ)~") was used as the theme song to the Japanese movie Jinx!!! which member Hyomin starred in. Limited editions come in a special paper jacket, while Christmas edition is packed in a box and comes with a remix album, a DVD, and six "T-ARA Santa ver." rubber keyholders. Regular edition comes with the bonus track "A-ha." All editions come with a trading card with a serial code (one randomly chosen out of 7 types). The Christmas edition was originally to be released along with the other editions, on November 20, but its release was delayed to December 18. The single reached number 13 on the Oricon charts, and charted for 7 weeks.

"Lead the Way / La'boon" is the ninth Japanese single (second double A-side) released by T-ara. It was released in three versions: eight limited CD+DVD editions, one type A, and seven type B (one per member), a box edition, and a regular CD Only edition. Each limited edition B features a DVD with a solo version of "Lead the Way" music video featuring one sole member. The box edition includes all six versions in one DVD and includes a 16-page photobook. All editions include one trading card with a serial code. Limited editions comes in a special package while the regular edition comes in a normal paper case. The single reached number 8 on the Oricon charts, and charted for 5 weeks.

Track listing

Charts

Oricon

References

T-ara albums
Japanese-language albums
EMI Records albums
Universal Music Japan albums
2014 albums